The 1842 New Hampshire gubernatorial election was held on March 8, 1842.

Incumbent Democratic Governor John Page did not stand for re-election.

Democratic nominee Henry Hubbard defeated Whig nominee Enos Stevens, Independent Democrat nominee John H. White, and Liberty nominee Daniel Hoit with 55.78% of the vote.

General election

Candidates
Daniel Hoit, Liberty, former State Senator, Liberty nominee for Governor in 1841
Henry Hubbard, Democratic, former U.S. Senator
Enos Stevens, Whig, former member of the Executive Council of New Hampshire, Whig nominee for Governor in 1840 and 1841
John H. White, Independent Democrat, judge. Contemporary newspapers refer to White as a 'Conservative' candidate. White was supported by former Governor and owner of Hill's New Hampshire Patriot, Isaac Hill. White appears to have declined the nomination.

Results

Notes

References

Bibliography

1842
New Hampshire
Gubernatorial